
Gmina Wojciechowice is a rural gmina (administrative district) in Opatów County, Świętokrzyskie Voivodeship, in south-central Poland.

Villages
Gmina Wojciechowice contains the villages and settlements of Bidziny, Drygulec, Gierczyce, Jasice, Kaliszany, Koszyce, Kunice, Łany, Lisów, Łopata, Ługi, Łukawka, Mierzanowice, Mikułowice, Nowa Wieś, Orłowiny, Podgajcze, Podkoszyce, Podlisów, Podłukawka, Sadłowice, Smugi, Stodoły, Stodoły-Kolonie, Wlonice and Wojciechowice.

Neighbouring gminas
Gmina Wojciechowice is bordered by the gminas of Ćmielów, Lipnik, Opatów, Ożarów and Wilczyce.

References
Polish official population figures 2006

Wojciechowice
Opatów County